Kokomo Pass, elevation , is a mountain pass in the Gore Range of the Rocky Mountains of Colorado in the United States.

See also

Southern Rocky Mountains
Gore Range
Colorado mountain passes

References

External links

Landforms of Eagle County, Colorado
Landforms of Summit County, Colorado
Mountain passes of Colorado